Mesembranol is an alkaloid found in Sceletium tortuosum.

References

Alkaloids
Methoxy compounds
Nitrogen heterocycles
Heterocyclic compounds with 2 rings